The Vicariate Apostolic of Chaco Paraguayo is a Latin Church ecclesiastical territory or apostolic vicariate of the Catholic Church located in the city of Fuerte Olimpo in Paraguay.

History
On 11 March 1948, Pope Pius XII established the Vicariate Apostolic of Chaco Paraguayo from the Diocese of Concepción y Chaco.

Ordinaries
 Ángel Muzzolón, SDB † (11 March 1948 – 6 March 1969)
 Alejo del Carmen Obelar Colman, SDB † (6 March 1969 – 13 September 1986)
 Zacarías Ortiz Rolón, SDB (12 March 1988 – 12 July 2003), appointed Bishop of Concepción (Santissima Concezione) en Paraguay
 Edmundo Valenzuela, SDB (13 February 2006 – 8 November 2011), appointed Coadjutor Archbishop of Asunción
 Gabriel Narciso Escobar Ayala, SDB (18 June 2013 – )

See also
 Roman Catholicism in Paraguay

Sources

Apostolic vicariates
Roman Catholic dioceses in Paraguay
Christian organizations established in 1948
Fuerte Olimpo